Ham Lands is a 72-hectare Local Nature Reserve and Site of Metropolitan Importance for Nature Conservation in Ham in the London Borough of Richmond upon Thames and the Royal Borough of Kingston upon Thames. The area is very popular with walkers, nature lovers, and horse-riders. There is an unofficial (non Council) off-road BMX track near Teddington Lock.

The site is a large area of grassland and scrub bordering the River Thames. The other boundary is mostly formed by Riverside Drive. The area is divided into two sections by the lagoon and Thames Young Mariners.

The land belonged to the Earl of Dysart until the nineteenth century. In 1904 it was leased by the Ham River Grit Co. Ltd for excavation of sand and ballast. They constructed a wharf and processing plant where barges loaded. A canal was constructed through the towpath in the 1920s to create an internal loading lagoon, now the Thames Young Mariners. The gravel pits were then backfilled with soil from different areas of London, creating a variety of habitats which attract many bird and butterfly species. By the 1960s tipping was complete and the Wates estate built along Riverside Drive.

The construction of Teddington Lock in 1904, now the limit of the tidal Thames, resulted in the raising of the towpath while the in-filled area was above the general level of flooding. The area north of Thames Young Mariners is still floodable. The flood-meadows have a wide range of wild flowers and there are many plants which are rare in London.  Some of the more unusual plants found include meadow saxifrage, hemlock water-dropwort, yellow vetchling, hoary cinquefoil/silver cinquefoil, dittander/pepperwort, bee orchid, pyramidal orchid.

Plans to build on the former gravel pits were finally abandoned by the Council in 1983. A survey of the flora was carried out by Nigel Hepper in 1985 and a report published in 1987 which recognised eight zones.

References

Further reading
 Williams, David. "Ham Lands (The Pits) – History", Ham is where the Heart is. Retrieved 19 October 2019.

External links
Friends of Ham Lands

Official website

Species checklist

Concise Check-list of Vascular Plants

Floodplains of Europe
Ham, London
Local nature reserves in Greater London
Nature reserves in the London Borough of Richmond upon Thames
Parks and open spaces in the London Borough of Richmond upon Thames
Parks and open spaces in the Royal Borough of Kingston upon Thames
Parks and open spaces on the River Thames
Nature reserves in the Royal Borough of Kingston upon Thames